The 1974 VFL season was the 78th season of the Victorian Football League (VFL), the highest level senior Australian rules football competition in Victoria. The season featured twelve clubs, ran from 6 April until 28 September, and comprised a 22-game home-and-away season followed by a finals series featuring the top five clubs.

The premiership was won by the Richmond Football Club for the ninth time and second time consecutively, after it defeated  by 41 points in the 1974 VFL Grand Final.

Premiership season
In 1974, the VFL competition consisted of twelve teams of 18 on-the-field players each, plus two substitute players, known as the 19th man and the 20th man. A player could be substituted for any reason; however, once substituted, a player could not return to the field of play under any circumstances.

Teams played each other in a home-and-away season of 22 rounds; matches 12 to 22 were the "home-and-way reverse" of matches 1 to 11.

Once the 22 round home-and-away season had finished, the 1974 VFL Premiers were determined by the specific format and conventions of the "McIntyre final five system".

Round 1

|- bgcolor="#CCCCFF"
| Home team
| Home team score
| Away team
| Away team score
| Venue
| Crowd
| Date
|- bgcolor="#FFFFFF"
| 
| 16.14 (110)
| 
| 9.11 (65)
| Western Oval
| 15,204
| 6 April 1974
|- bgcolor="#FFFFFF"
| 
| 17.15 (117)
| 
| 15.10 (100)
| Victoria Park
| 30,493
| 6 April 1974
|- bgcolor="#FFFFFF"
| 
| 14.13 (97)
| 
| 6.12 (48)
| Princes Park
| 16,562
| 6 April 1974
|- bgcolor="#FFFFFF"
| 
| 15.10 (100)
| 
| 11.14 (80)
| Lake Oval
| 10,744
| 6 April 1974
|- bgcolor="#FFFFFF"
| 
| 12.16 (88)
| 
| 15.14 (104)
| MCG
| 38,735
| 6 April 1974
|- bgcolor="#FFFFFF"
| 
| 11.17 (83)
| 
| 6.7 (43)
| Moorabbin Oval
| 17,286
| 6 April 1974

Round 2

|- bgcolor="#CCCCFF"
| Home team
| Home team score
| Away team
| Away team score
| Venue
| Crowd
| Date
|- bgcolor="#FFFFFF"
| 
| 9.13 (67)
| 
| 15.26 (116)
| Junction Oval
| 17,040
| 13 April 1974
|- bgcolor="#FFFFFF"
| 
| 6.12 (48)
| 
| 10.11 (71)
| Princes Park
| 28,689
| 13 April 1974
|- bgcolor="#FFFFFF"
| 
| 15.7 (97)
| 
| 12.16 (88)
| Kardinia Park
| 21,043
| 13 April 1974
|- bgcolor="#FFFFFF"
| 
| 11.20 (86)
| 
| 14.16 (100)
| MCG
| 36,708
| 15 April 1974
|- bgcolor="#FFFFFF"
| 
| 21.24 (150)
| 
| 10.18 (78)
| Windy Hill
| 25,348
| 15 April 1974
|- bgcolor="#FFFFFF"
| 
| 20.12 (132)
| 
| 11.9 (75)
| Arden Street Oval
| 21,358
| 15 April 1974

Round 3

|- bgcolor="#CCCCFF"
| Home team
| Home team score
| Away team
| Away team score
| Venue
| Crowd
| Date
|- bgcolor="#FFFFFF"
| 
| 16.16 (112)
| 
| 14.15 (99)
| Victoria Park
| 23,233
| 20 April 1974
|- bgcolor="#FFFFFF"
| 
| 11.15 (81)
| 
| 18.11 (119)
| Princes Park
| 33,050
| 20 April 1974
|- bgcolor="#FFFFFF"
| 
| 8.18 (66)
| 
| 20.15 (135)
| Lake Oval
| 12,157
| 20 April 1974
|- bgcolor="#FFFFFF"
| 
| 16.10 (106)
| 
| 16.14 (110)
| MCG
| 21,041
| 20 April 1974
|- bgcolor="#FFFFFF"
| 
| 17.18 (120)
| 
| 7.11 (53)
| Arden Street Oval
| 21,358
| 20 April 1974
|- bgcolor="#FFFFFF"
| 
| 16.14 (110)
| 
| 15.15 (105)
| VFL Park
| 35,064
| 20 April 1974

Round 4

|- bgcolor="#CCCCFF"
| Home team
| Home team score
| Away team
| Away team score
| Venue
| Crowd
| Date
|- bgcolor="#FFFFFF"
| 
| 18.12 (120)
| 
| 17.9 (111)
| Junction Oval
| 28,471
| 25 April 1974
|- bgcolor="#FFFFFF"
| 
| 19.9 (123)
| 
| 6.15 (51)
| VFL Park
| 54,086
| 25 April 1974
|- bgcolor="#FFFFFF"
| 
| 6.9 (45)
| 
| 8.13 (61)
| Kardinia Park
| 18,550
| 27 April 1974
|- bgcolor="#FFFFFF"
| 
| 15.6 (96)
| 
| 7.9 (51)
| Western Oval
| 12,491
| 27 April 1974
|- bgcolor="#FFFFFF"
| 
| 13.16 (94)
| 
| 9.15 (69)
| MCG
| 28,080
| 27 April 1974
|- bgcolor="#FFFFFF"
| 
| 9.15 (69)
| 
| 5.13 (43)
| Princes Park
| 17,590
| 27 April 1974

Round 5

|- bgcolor="#CCCCFF"
| Home team
| Home team score
| Away team
| Away team score
| Venue
| Crowd
| Date
|- bgcolor="#FFFFFF"
| 
| 13.11 (89)
| 
| 19.15 (129)
| MCG
| 23,616
| 4 May 1974
|- bgcolor="#FFFFFF"
| 
| 12.26 (98)
| 
| 10.14 (74)
| Windy Hill
| 19,123
| 4 May 1974
|- bgcolor="#FFFFFF"
| 
| 13.12 (90)
| 
| 15.20 (110)
| Moorabbin Oval
| 30,673
| 4 May 1974
|- bgcolor="#FFFFFF"
| 
| 14.16 (100)
| 
| 15.10 (100)
| Lake Oval
| 10,316
| 4 May 1974
|- bgcolor="#FFFFFF"
| 
| 13.14 (92)
| 
| 10.14 (74)
| Victoria Park
| 33,452
| 4 May 1974
|- bgcolor="#FFFFFF"
| 
| 8.14 (62)
| 
| 11.19 (85)
| VFL Park
| 20,281
| 4 May 1974

Round 6

|- bgcolor="#CCCCFF"
| Home team
| Home team score
| Away team
| Away team score
| Venue
| Crowd
| Date
|- bgcolor="#FFFFFF"
| 
| 22.20 (152)
| 
| 9.5 (59)
| Arden Street Oval
| 17,545
| 11 May 1974
|- bgcolor="#FFFFFF"
| 
| 18.16 (124)
| 
| 13.16 (94)
| Junction Oval
| 10,583
| 11 May 1974
|- bgcolor="#FFFFFF"
| 
| 19.21 (135)
| 
| 12.9 (81)
| Princes Park
| 19,902
| 11 May 1974
|- bgcolor="#FFFFFF"
| 
| 17.11 (113)
| 
| 18.15 (123)
| MCG
| 31,483
| 11 May 1974
|- bgcolor="#FFFFFF"
| 
| 17.12 (114)
| 
| 8.16 (64)
| Western Oval
| 26,309
| 11 May 1974
|- bgcolor="#FFFFFF"
| 
| 13.11 (89)
| 
| 12.7 (79)
| VFL Park
| 25,161
| 11 May 1974

Round 7

|- bgcolor="#CCCCFF"
| Home team
| Home team score
| Away team
| Away team score
| Venue
| Crowd
| Date
|- bgcolor="#FFFFFF"
| 
| 9.5 (59)
| 
| 13.12 (90)
| Kardinia Park
| 24,685
| 18 May 1974
|- bgcolor="#FFFFFF"
| 
| 15.15 (105)
| 
| 16.19 (115)
| Windy Hill
| 24,376
| 18 May 1974
|- bgcolor="#FFFFFF"
| 
| 13.16 (94)
| 
| 11.10 (76)
| Lake Oval
| 10,239
| 18 May 1974
|- bgcolor="#FFFFFF"
| 
| 12.10 (82)
| 
| 11.22 (88)
| Moorabbin Oval
| 27,876
| 18 May 1974
|- bgcolor="#FFFFFF"
| 
| 13.22 (100)
| 
| 8.12 (60)
| Princes Park
| 21,202
| 18 May 1974
|- bgcolor="#FFFFFF"
| 
| 12.15 (87)
| 
| 8.12 (60)
| VFL Park
| 19,450
| 18 May 1974

Round 8

|- bgcolor="#CCCCFF"
| Home team
| Home team score
| Away team
| Away team score
| Venue
| Crowd
| Date
|- bgcolor="#FFFFFF"
| 
| 9.16 (70)
| 
| 13.17 (95)
| Arden Street Oval
| 22,841
| 25 May 1974
|- bgcolor="#FFFFFF"
| 
| 11.14 (80)
| 
| 18.13 (121)
| Victoria Park
| 22,858
| 25 May 1974
|- bgcolor="#FFFFFF"
| 
| 9.12 (66)
| 
| 9.12 (66)
| Princes Park
| 20,830
| 25 May 1974
|- bgcolor="#FFFFFF"
| 
| 6.15 (51)
| 
| 13.21 (99)
| MCG
| 18,029
| 25 May 1974
|- bgcolor="#FFFFFF"
| 
| 16.11 (107)
| 
| 14.15 (99)
| Junction Oval
| 15,516
| 25 May 1974
|- bgcolor="#FFFFFF"
| 
| 8.9 (57)
| 
| 10.10 (70)
| VFL Park
| 16,516
| 25 May 1974

Round 9

|- bgcolor="#CCCCFF"
| Home team
| Home team score
| Away team
| Away team score
| Venue
| Crowd
| Date
|- bgcolor="#FFFFFF"
| 
| 18.15 (123)
| 
| 10.16 (76)
| Princes Park
| 12,630
| 1 June 1974
|- bgcolor="#FFFFFF"
| 
| 16.12 (108)
| 
| 17.7 (109)
| Kardinia Park
| 15,664
| 1 June 1974
|- bgcolor="#FFFFFF"
| 
| 13.16 (94)
| 
| 8.8 (56)
| Western Oval
| 15,415
| 1 June 1974
|- bgcolor="#FFFFFF"
| 
| 11.15 (81)
| 
| 16.15 (111)
| Arden Street Oval
| 20,027
| 1 June 1974
|- bgcolor="#FFFFFF"
| 
| 9.20 (74)
| 
| 21.17 (143)
| MCG
| 66,829
| 1 June 1974
|- bgcolor="#FFFFFF"
| 
| 7.10 (52)
| 
| 16.15 (111)
| VFL Park
| 19,906
| 1 June 1974

Round 10

|- bgcolor="#CCCCFF"
| Home team
| Home team score
| Away team
| Away team score
| Venue
| Crowd
| Date
|- bgcolor="#FFFFFF"
| 
| 12.10 (82)
| 
| 8.15 (63)
| Victoria Park
| 25,892
| 8 June 1974
|- bgcolor="#FFFFFF"
| 
| 9.13 (67)
| 
| 23.9 (147)
| Lake Oval
| 12,054
| 8 June 1974
|- bgcolor="#FFFFFF"
| 
| 9.9 (63)
| 
| 11.10 (76)
| Moorabbin Oval
| 17,667
| 8 June 1974
|- bgcolor="#FFFFFF"
| 
| 19.10 (124)
| 
| 13.15 (93)
| MCG
| 12,414
| 8 June 1974
|- bgcolor="#FFFFFF"
| 
| 9.14 (68)
| 
| 16.7 (103)
| Windy Hill
| 24,436
| 8 June 1974
|- bgcolor="#FFFFFF"
| 
| 14.13 (97)
| 
| 10.6 (66)
| VFL Park
| 18,562
| 8 June 1974

Round 11

|- bgcolor="#CCCCFF"
| Home team
| Home team score
| Away team
| Away team score
| Venue
| Crowd
| Date
|- bgcolor="#FFFFFF"
| 
| 20.13 (133)
| 
| 13.10 (88)
| Princes Park
| 26,030
| 15 June 1974
|- bgcolor="#FFFFFF"
| 
| 10.13 (73)
| 
| 15.14 (104)
| Lake Oval
| 16,908
| 15 June 1974
|- bgcolor="#FFFFFF"
| 
| 10.10 (70)
| 
| 15.15 (105)
| VFL Park
| 21,396
| 15 June 1974
|- bgcolor="#FFFFFF"
| 
| 14.11 (95)
| 
| 9.21 (75)
| Arden Street Oval
| 17,368
| 17 June 1974
|- bgcolor="#FFFFFF"
| 
| 19.19 (133)
| 
| 15.11 (101)
| MCG
| 68,446
| 17 June 1974
|- bgcolor="#FFFFFF"
| 
| 10.15 (75)
| 
| 10.13 (73)
| Kardinia Park
| 18,396
| 17 June 1974

Round 12

|- bgcolor="#CCCCFF"
| Home team
| Home team score
| Away team
| Away team score
| Venue
| Crowd
| Date
|- bgcolor="#FFFFFF"
| 
| 28.17 (185)
| 
| 12.7 (79)
| Arden Street Oval
| 9,016
| 22 June 1974
|- bgcolor="#FFFFFF"
| 
| 19.17 (131)
| 
| 15.18 (108)
| Princes Park
| 15,710
| 22 June 1974
|- bgcolor="#FFFFFF"
| 
| 13.14 (92)
| 
| 12.15 (87)
| Junction Oval
| 12,519
| 22 June 1974
|- bgcolor="#FFFFFF"
| 
| 13.12 (90)
| 
| 19.9 (123)
| Windy Hill
| 25,867
| 22 June 1974
|- bgcolor="#FFFFFF"
| 
| 11.13 (79)
| 
| 15.18 (108)
| MCG
| 23,336
| 22 June 1974
|- bgcolor="#FFFFFF"
| 
| 13.14 (92)
| 
| 8.10 (58)
| VFL Park
| 16,320
| 22 June 1974

Round 13

|- bgcolor="#CCCCFF"
| Home team
| Home team score
| Away team
| Away team score
| Venue
| Crowd
| Date
|- bgcolor="#FFFFFF"
| 
| 11.14 (80)
| 
| 19.10 (124)
| Western Oval
| 20,937
| 29 June 1974
|- bgcolor="#FFFFFF"
| 
| 13.18 (96)
| 
| 13.12 (90)
| Victoria Park
| 26,028
| 29 June 1974
|- bgcolor="#FFFFFF"
| 
| 20.19 (139)
| 
| 10.6 (66)
| Princes Park
| 23,490
| 29 June 1974
|- bgcolor="#FFFFFF"
| 
| 11.13 (79)
| 
| 13.10 (88)
| Moorabbin Oval
| 13,804
| 29 June 1974
|- bgcolor="#FFFFFF"
| 
| 11.16 (82)
| 
| 14.12 (96)
| Lake Oval
| 10,494
| 29 June 1974
|- bgcolor="#FFFFFF"
| 
| 29.21 (195)
| 
| 9.12 (66)
| VFL Park
| 16,455
| 29 June 1974

Round 14

|- bgcolor="#CCCCFF"
| Home team
| Home team score
| Away team
| Away team score
| Venue
| Crowd
| Date
|- bgcolor="#FFFFFF"
| 
| 11.24 (90)
| 
| 23.15 (153)
| MCG
| 21,146
| 6 July 1974
|- bgcolor="#FFFFFF"
| 
| 11.9 (75)
| 
| 23.17 (155)
| Windy Hill
| 16,493
| 6 July 1974
|- bgcolor="#FFFFFF"
| 
| 24.14 (158)
| 
| 19.13 (127)
| Victoria Park
| 17,913
| 6 July 1974
|- bgcolor="#FFFFFF"
| 
| 10.12 (72)
| 
| 18.13 (121)
| Princes Park
| 27,600
| 6 July 1974
|- bgcolor="#FFFFFF"
| 
| 19.27 (141)
| 
| 12.19 (91)
| Lake Oval
| 9,739
| 6 July 1974
|- bgcolor="#FFFFFF"
| 
| 12.20 (92)
| 
| 11.12 (78)
| VFL Park
| 13,926
| 6 July 1974

Round 15

|- bgcolor="#CCCCFF"
| Home team
| Home team score
| Away team
| Away team score
| Venue
| Crowd
| Date
|- bgcolor="#FFFFFF"
| 
| 16.14 (110)
| 
| 4.7 (31)
| Princes Park
| 7,075
| 13 July 1974
|- bgcolor="#FFFFFF"
| 
| 12.11 (83)
| 
| 9.9 (63)
| Kardinia Park
| 10,873
| 13 July 1974
|- bgcolor="#FFFFFF"
| 
| 16.13 (109)
| 
| 10.8 (68)
| Moorabbin Oval
| 14,244
| 13 July 1974
|- bgcolor="#FFFFFF"
| 
| 6.10 (46)
| 
| 7.12 (54)
| Western Oval
| 18,515
| 13 July 1974
|- bgcolor="#FFFFFF"
| 
| 15.15 (105)
| 
| 11.9 (75)
| MCG
| 36,417
| 13 July 1974
|- bgcolor="#FFFFFF"
| 
| 8.7 (55)
| 
| 10.8 (68)
| VFL Park
| 7,615
| 13 July 1974

Round 16

|- bgcolor="#CCCCFF"
| Home team
| Home team score
| Away team
| Away team score
| Venue
| Crowd
| Date
|- bgcolor="#FFFFFF"
| 
| 15.24 (114)
| 
| 11.13 (79)
| MCG
| 28,045
| 20 July 1974
|- bgcolor="#FFFFFF"
| 
| 8.12 (60)
| 
| 12.9 (81)
| Western Oval
| 15,299
| 20 July 1974
|- bgcolor="#FFFFFF"
| 
| 10.13 (73)
| 
| 19.19 (133)
| Junction Oval
| 8,110
| 20 July 1974
|- bgcolor="#FFFFFF"
| 
| 19.14 (128)
| 
| 9.10 (64)
| Arden Street Oval
| 9,094
| 20 July 1974
|- bgcolor="#FFFFFF"
| 
| 11.11 (77)
| 
| 14.9 (93)
| Kardinia Park
| 15,897
| 20 July 1974
|- bgcolor="#FFFFFF"
| 
| 18.10 (118)
| 
| 13.4 (82)
| VFL Park
| 47,558
| 20 July 1974

Round 17

|- bgcolor="#CCCCFF"
| Home team
| Home team score
| Away team
| Away team score
| Venue
| Crowd
| Date
|- bgcolor="#FFFFFF"
| 
| 9.10 (64)
| 
| 13.15 (93)
| Windy Hill
| 16,250
| 27 July 1974
|- bgcolor="#FFFFFF"
| 
| 10.13 (73)
| 
| 11.16 (82)
| Moorabbin Oval
| 15,954
| 27 July 1974
|- bgcolor="#FFFFFF"
| 
| 13.28 (106)
| 
| 8.10 (58)
| Princes Park
| 6,198
| 27 July 1974
|- bgcolor="#FFFFFF"
| 
| 15.21 (111)
| 
| 17.13 (115)
| MCG
| 22,893
| 27 July 1974
|- bgcolor="#FFFFFF"
| 
| 14.17 (101)
| 
| 11.14 (80)
| Lake Oval
| 14,114
| 27 July 1974
|- bgcolor="#FFFFFF"
| 
| 8.9 (57)
| 
| 13.15 (93)
| VFL Park
| 15,578
| 27 July 1974

Round 18

|- bgcolor="#CCCCFF"
| Home team
| Home team score
| Away team
| Away team score
| Venue
| Crowd
| Date
|- bgcolor="#FFFFFF"
| 
| 9.16 (70)
| 
| 14.9 (93)
| Junction Oval
| 9,552
| 3 August 1974
|- bgcolor="#FFFFFF"
| 
| 13.10 (88)
| 
| 13.16 (94)
| Victoria Park
| 21,433
| 3 August 1974
|- bgcolor="#FFFFFF"
| 
| 14.12 (96)
| 
| 18.12 (120)
| Princes Park
| 23,180
| 3 August 1974
|- bgcolor="#FFFFFF"
| 
| 15.9 (99)
| 
| 15.15 (105)
| Arden Street Oval
| 10,638
| 3 August 1974
|- bgcolor="#FFFFFF"
| 
| 20.15 (135)
| 
| 12.16 (88)
| MCG
| 34,011
| 3 August 1974
|- bgcolor="#FFFFFF"
| 
| 11.17 (83)
| 
| 14.13 (97)
| VFL Park
| 13,188
| 3 August 1974

Round 19

|- bgcolor="#CCCCFF"
| Home team
| Home team score
| Away team
| Away team score
| Venue
| Crowd
| Date
|- bgcolor="#FFFFFF"
| 
| 9.13 (67)
| 
| 13.15 (93)
| Moorabbin Oval
| 17,833
| 10 August 1974
|- bgcolor="#FFFFFF"
| 
| 17.20 (122)
| 
| 14.13 (97)
| Princes Park
| 8,476
| 10 August 1974
|- bgcolor="#FFFFFF"
| 
| 24.15 (159)
| 
| 8.13 (61)
| Windy Hill
| 10,753
| 10 August 1974
|- bgcolor="#FFFFFF"
| 
| 8.8 (56)
| 
| 10.19 (79)
| Kardinia Park
| 22,826
| 10 August 1974
|- bgcolor="#FFFFFF"
| 
| 10.8 (68)
| 
| 4.20 (44)
| Western Oval
| 28,151
| 10 August 1974
|- bgcolor="#FFFFFF"
| 
| 15.12 (102)
| 
| 11.11 (77)
| VFL Park
| 40,399
| 10 August 1974

Round 20

|- bgcolor="#CCCCFF"
| Home team
| Home team score
| Away team
| Away team score
| Venue
| Crowd
| Date
|- bgcolor="#FFFFFF"
| 
| 14.14 (98)
| 
| 16.12 (108)
| Windy Hill
| 19,229
| 17 August 1974
|- bgcolor="#FFFFFF"
| 
| 10.20 (80)
| 
| 16.11 (107)
| Victoria Park
| 36,729
| 17 August 1974
|- bgcolor="#FFFFFF"
| 
| 17.14 (116)
| 
| 10.15 (75)
| Princes Park
| 13,400
| 17 August 1974
|- bgcolor="#FFFFFF"
| 
| 13.7 (85)
| 
| 12.14 (86)
| Lake Oval
| 12,176
| 17 August 1974
|- bgcolor="#FFFFFF"
| 
| 10.15 (75)
| 
| 23.21 (159)
| MCG
| 17,951
| 17 August 1974
|- bgcolor="#FFFFFF"
| 
| 11.9 (75)
| 
| 16.12 (108)
| VFL Park
| 21,561
| 17 August 1974

Round 21

|- bgcolor="#CCCCFF"
| Home team
| Home team score
| Away team
| Away team score
| Venue
| Crowd
| Date
|- bgcolor="#FFFFFF"
| 
| 23.24 (162)
| 
| 17.27 (129)
| MCG
| 32,651
| 24 August 1974
|- bgcolor="#FFFFFF"
| 
| 15.12 (102)
| 
| 9.8 (62)
| Kardinia Park
| 17,844
| 24 August 1974
|- bgcolor="#FFFFFF"
| 
| 7.19 (61)
| 
| 7.15 (57)
| Western Oval
| 17,675
| 24 August 1974
|- bgcolor="#FFFFFF"
| 
| 14.16 (100)
| 
| 20.13 (133)
| Junction Oval
| 7,803
| 24 August 1974
|- bgcolor="#FFFFFF"
| 
| 25.15 (165)
| 
| 10.14 (74)
| Arden Street Oval
| 25,757
| 24 August 1974
|- bgcolor="#FFFFFF"
| 
| 12.11 (83)
| 
| 12.17 (89)
| VFL Park
| 27,321
| 24 August 1974

Round 22

|- bgcolor="#CCCCFF"
| Home team
| Home team score
| Away team
| Away team score
| Venue
| Crowd
| Date
|- bgcolor="#FFFFFF"
| 
| 10.17 (77)
| 
| 16.10 (106)
| Princes Park
| 28,110
| 31 August 1974
|- bgcolor="#FFFFFF"
| 
| 13.9 (87)
| 
| 11.14 (80)
| Western Oval
| 25,190
| 31 August 1974
|- bgcolor="#FFFFFF"
| 
| 15.11 (101)
| 
| 17.11 (113)
| Junction Oval
| 8,812
| 31 August 1974
|- bgcolor="#FFFFFF"
| 
| 20.17 (137)
| 
| 15.13 (103)
| Windy Hill
| 13,561
| 31 August 1974
|- bgcolor="#FFFFFF"
| 
| 15.11 (101)
| 
| 19.9 (123)
| Moorabbin Oval
| 16,458
| 31 August 1974
|- bgcolor="#FFFFFF"
| 
| 13.15 (93)
| 
| 15.10 (100)
| VFL Park
| 33,786
| 31 August 1974

Ladder

Finals

Elimination final

|- bgcolor="#CCCCFF"
| Home team
| Score
| Away team
| Score
| Venue
| Crowd
| Date
|- bgcolor="#FFFFFF"
| 
| 19.10 (124)
| 
| 6.19 (55)
| VFL Park
| 57,912
| 7 September

Qualifying final

|- bgcolor="#CCCCFF"
| Home team
| Score
| Away team
| Score
| Venue
| Crowd
| Date
|- bgcolor="#FFFFFF"
| 
| 8.17 (65)
| 
| 15.13 (103)
| MCG
| 77,519
| 7 September
|- bgcolor="#FFFFFF"

Semi-finals

|- bgcolor="#CCCCFF"
| Home team
| Score
| Away team
| Score
| Venue
| Crowd
| Date
|- bgcolor="#FFFFFF"
| 
| 21.12 (138)
| 
| 13.10 (88)
| MCG
| 84,846
| 14 September
|- bgcolor="#FFFFFF"
| 
| 10.13 (73)
| 
| 6.16 (52)
| VFL Park
| 57,569
| 14 September

Preliminary final

|- bgcolor="#CCCCFF"
| Home team
| Score
| Away team
| Score
| Venue
| Crowd
| Date
|- bgcolor="#FFFFFF"
| 
| 7.9 (51)
| 
| 8.8 (56)
| MCG
| 88,262
| 21 September

Grand final

Richmond defeated North Melbourne 18.20 (128) to 13.9 (87), in front of a crowd of 113,839 people. (For an explanation of scoring see Australian rules football).

Awards
 The 1974 VFL seniors Premiership team was Richmond.
 The 1974 VFL reserves Premiership team was Fitzroy.
 The 1974 VFL under 19s Premiership team was Collingwood.
 The VFL's leading goalkicker was Doug Wade of North Melbourne who kicked 103 goals (including 12 goals in the finals).
 The winner of the 1974 Brownlow Medal was Keith Greig of North Melbourne with 27 votes.
Many were even more surprised at Greig winning his second Brownlow than they had been at him winning his first (in 1973). In 1973 Barry Davis had won North Melbourne's best and fairest award, and in 1974 John Rantall won North Melbourne's best and fairest award. Greig had not even been the "runner-up" in North Melbourne's best and fairest in either 1973 or 1974.
 Melbourne took the seniors "wooden spoon" in 1974.
 Collingwood 17.14 (116) defeated Essendon 9.14 (68) in the grand final of the under 19s premiership, held at the Melbourne Cricket Ground on 28 September.
 Fitzroy 26.13 (169) defeated Footscray 16.12 (108) in the grand final of the reserves premiership, held at the Melbourne Cricket Ground on 28 September.
 Richmond 18.20 (128) defeated North Melbourne 13.9 (87) in the grand final of the seniors premiership, held at the Melbourne Cricket Ground on 28 September.

Notable events
 North Melbourne would become the first team to trial coloured shorts (club colour royal blue), due to the impending introduction of colour television in Australia. All teams (except Collingwood, Richmond and St. Kilda where black was a club colour) would follow suit from the beginning of 1975 after colour television was introduced.
 In the Round 7 match between Essendon and Richmond at Windy Hill, Richmond's Mal Brown clashed with Essendon's Graeme Jenkin as the teams moved towards the locker rooms at the half-time siren; after Essendon runner Laurie Ashley went out of his way to confront and abuse Brown, Brown struck Ashley, starting a 15-minute brawl that involved players, team officials, trainers, fans, and police. Richmond's Brian Roberts was left with a broken nose, while Essendon trainer Jim Bradley and a fan were both knocked unconscious and had to be carried from the arena on stretchers. Four players and three officials were charged as a result of the investigation:
 Laurie Ashley (Essendon runner): suspended for 6 matches after being held to be responsible for starting the brawl.
 Mal Brown (Richmond player): suspended for one match for striking Laurie Ashley.
 Jim Bradley (Essendon fitness adviser): suspended for 6 matches for charging and striking Mal Brown.
 Steve Parsons (Richmond player): suspended for 4 matches for striking Jim Bradley.
 Ron Andrews (Essendon player): suspended for 6 matches for striking Brian Roberts.
 Graeme Richmond (Richmond team manager): suspended until 31 December 1974 (17 matches) and fined $2,000 by the VFL Board of Directors for conduct unbecoming or prejudicial to the interests of the League. On 18 September, the VFL demanded that Richmond pay the fine or face indefinite suspension, but the VFL dropped the fine on appeal.
 John Cassin (Essendon player): cleared after the tribunal found that he was only trying to assist in breaking up the brawl.
 As a result of a police investigation, assault charges were laid against Steve Parsons and Graeme Richmond; both Parsons and Richmond were cleared of these charges on 11 September.
 In the Round 21 match between Richmond and South Melbourne, there is a record 51 aggregate behinds and 91 aggregate scoring shots.
 North Melbourne full-forward Doug Wade kicked his 1,000th career goal in the qualifying final against Hawthorn at the Melbourne Cricket Ground on 7 September. He also kicked his 100th goal of the season in the grand final.

References

Bibliography
 Hogan, P., The Tigers of Old, The Richmond Football Club, (Richmond), 1996. 
 Maplestone, M., Flying Higher: History of the Essendon Football Club 1872–1996, Essendon Football Club, (Melbourne), 1996. 
 Rogers, S. & Brown, A., Every Game Ever Played: VFL/AFL Results 1897–1997 (Sixth Edition), Viking Books, (Ringwood), 1998. 
 Ross, J. (ed), 100 Years of Australian Football 1897–1996: The Complete Story of the AFL, All the Big Stories, All the Great Pictures, All the Champions, Every AFL Season Reported, Viking, (Ringwood), 1996.

External links
 1974 Season – AFL Tables
 "Memories are made of this: 27. The Windy Hill Brawl, 1974" (Sunday Age, 15 September 2002)

Australian Football League seasons
Season